The 1998–99 European Hockey League was the third edition of the European Hockey League. The season started on September 15, 1998, and finished on February 14, 1999.

The tournament was won by Metallurg Magnitogorsk, who beat HC Dynamo Moscow in an all-Russian final. The game is best remembered for a tying goal allowed by Metallurg goaltender Boris Tortunov with just 8 seconds remaining, on a slapshot from his own end by Dynamo defenceman Andrei Markov. Metallurg overcame the late setback to win in overtime on a goal by Kazakhstani defenceman Vladimir Antipin. This was Dynamo's third straight defeat in a European final, and their fifth overall including their two straight losses in the 1992 and 1993 IIHF European Cups.

The points system used in the first round of the tournament was: the winner in regular time won 3 points; in case of a tie, an overtime is played, the winner in overtime won 2 points and the loser in overtime won 1 point.

First round

Group A

Group A standings

Group B

Group B standings

Group C

Group C standings

Group D

Group D standings

Group E

Group E standings

Group F

Group F standings

Second round

Third round

Group A
(Berlin, Germany)

Group A standings

Group B
(Helsinki, Finland)

Group B standings

Final stage
(Moscow, Russia)

Semifinals

Third place match

Final

References

 Season 1999

1998–99 in European ice hockey leagues
European Hockey League